The Consequences of Prohibition did not just include effects on people's drinking habits but also on the worldwide economy, the people's trust of the government, and the public health system. Alcohol, from the rise of the temperance movement to modern day restrictions around the world, has long been a source of turmoil. When alcoholic beverages were first banned under the Volstead Act in 1919, the United States government had little idea of the severity of the consequences. It was first thought that a ban on alcohol would increase the moral character of society, but a ban on alcohol had vast unintended consequences. 

The first to be impacted were the alcohol manufactures and distributers. When they were shut down, it caused a massive drop in the economy and led to the unemployment of thousands of workers. Additionally, venues such as theaters and clubs which previously used alcohol to draw people in lost much of their business.

Various methods to obtain alcohol, whether illegally or through legal loopholes in the system, were established. Bootlegging and organized crime became a prominent issue in the United States. Various secret venues popped up around the country, often formed by organized crime syndicates. Because of the rise in illegal manufacturing and limited resources, few restrictions were placed on the production of alcohol. Questionable ingredients were frequently added which were harmful to human consumption. Poisoning became a serious issue as various un-safe methods were used to make the production of alcohol an easier and cheaper process. Though these methods led to an increase in sales, and larger profits for those selling them, they had severe health consequences on those who bought illegal alcohol. Another way in which alcohol could be obtained was through a medical prescription. Though there were limits to how much a doctor could prescribe, this access to alcoholic drinks intended for medical purposes was heavily abused. Relatively few medical licenses were revoked.  

With the rapid increase in organized crime and illegal production of alcohol, there was a great strain on law enforcement. Lack of funding due to losing out on much tax revenue from alcohol manufacturers did not help the mounting problem. Desperate for solutions, the government took to more extreme measures. Whether directly or indirectly, the government began to increase the toxicity of industrial alcohol used to make illegal alcoholic beverages to discourage consumption. One prominent method, which ultimately lead to the death of thousands, was the use of methyl alcohol. This type of alcohol can be deadly even in small doses. Whether obtaining liquor illegally or sourcing it from industrial alcohol poisoned by the government, drinking alcohol was dangerous during the prohibition era. A famous example of poisoning is the case of Bix Beiderbecke whose medical records and subsequent death seem to point to methanol poisoning, possibly because of the United States government. 

Various governments around the world adopted prohibition measures, as can be seen in several European countries, Canada, and New Zealand, around the time of the Volstead act. More modern examples include Iran, whose restriction on alcohol helped contribute to poisonings across the country during the outbreak of Covid-19, and the Czech Republic, who placed temporary restrictions on alcoholic drinks to protect consumers from poisonous substances already present in the liquor.

History 
The 18th amendment went into effect on January 16, 1920, prohibiting all commercial use of alcohol. Alcohol had long been a source of contention in the United States, the temperance movement having started in the early 1800s. The temperance movement was founded upon the principles that alcohol was inherently evil and led its consumers to become violent, lazy, and poor contributors to society. Regarding these issues, The Millbank Quarterly said that supporters of the temperance movement "regarded alcohol the way people today view heroin: as an inherently addicting substance". Alcohol was often deemed by anti-alcoholics as the main cause of a failing society. The movement was led largely by the middle-class and was strongly backed by women. In fact, the temperance movement was often associated and interconnected with the women's rights movement.

When the Volstead Act was passed, major alcohol producers were forced to close down their businesses and thousands of workers were left without jobs. "The Bureau of Internal revenue estimated that the prohibition cause the shutdown of over 200 distilleries, a thousand breweries, and over 170,000 liquor stores." Additionally, performance venues, theaters and clubs that sold alcohol took hits as they lost customers who could no longer drink in these places. This caused a massive blow to the economy as the tax revenue for alcohol in the year 1914 (a few years before the Volstead Act) was an estimated $226,000,000.     

Additional problems arose in the form of illegal production and distribution of alcohol and an increase in organized crime. Bootleggers were able to sell alcohol completely untaxed as their alcohol production was kept hidden from the United States government. Because of the outrage of people toward the banning of liquor, many were more than willing to buy illegally. Various secret venues and clubs formed around the country. Crime syndicates used this opportunity to spread their influence. As they continued to produce and sell alcohol, the government poured millions of dollars into the Bureau of Prohibition to increase enforcement. The agency was much too small to handle the rapid growth in crime.

(See the article "Prohibition in the United States" for more information)

Enforcement 
A prominent effect of Prohibition was the nearly total destruction of the liquor market. The public believed that Prohibition would be permanent, especially since there had never been a constitutional amendment that hadn't persisted. Preceding events suggested that the federal government would put a limit on how much alcohol content drinks could have, or how much a person could consume, but eventually, Congress unreservedly outlawed liquor. The Volstead act and the 18th amendment together made it nearly impossible to distribute liquor or even possess drinks with more than "0.5% alcohol by volume." Even so, individuals possessing any alcoholic drink, even under this limit, were at risk of prosecution.

Though the government did introduce conditions that would help the transition to occur more smoothly, it was not enough. It was thought that "eliminating the legal manufacture and sale of alcoholic drink would solve the major social and economic problems of American society." Prohibition was opposed by a diverse group before it went into effect. Bootlegging, the process of making illegal alcoholic beverages, quickly sprang up throughout the United States. Many participated in these practices. On the contrary, many individuals also decided to abide by the new radical laws. Some positive changes did come from Prohibition in the United States, but acceptance was not widespread enough to merit the challenges the country faced.

Due to the economic crashes caused by Prohibition, entire industries were shattered by the loss of trade routes and investors, creating a demand for alcoholic drinks that severely outranked the supply. The effect was that more and more strong liquors were produced and distributed by bootleggers. Consequently, the government had to find a way to increase enforcement and regulation but was faced with limited funding already, especially with the loss of tax revenue coming from the sale of liquor. These challenges led the government to try some more treacherous methods.

Prohibition enforcement mainly consisted of cutting off supply through smuggling and illegal manufacturing of alcoholic products. The government was highly effective at preventing alcohol from entering the country illegally, but bootleggers found a way around this. By stealing or making deals to acquire industrial alcohol, (from factories that made ink, cleaning chemicals, fuels, adhesives, and various other products) bootleggers were able to cut out the long process of fermentation to make alcohol. Instead, they combined the industrial alcohol with their customary flavorings to make alcoholic beverages in a more efficient process. Subsequently, they made more money and were able to meet the high demand for the products.

The Volstead Act, legislation to enforce the 18th Amendment, carried out countermeasures to this practice. The United States federal government poisoned alcohol during Prohibition. There are various perspectives about what steps the government took and how far they went with this plan. USA Today stated that the government went to "unethical lengths to prevent alcohol consumption." However, this source does not agree that the government directly poisoned drinking alcohol. Instead, it claims that the government indirectly poisoned citizens by denaturing industrial alcohol meant for manufacturing. Others believe that Congress hired chemists to combat the bootleggers who were using stolen industrial alcohol to make moonshine and other drinks. Factories were obligated by law to denature their alcohol with chemicals that made it difficult to drink safely. In turn, bootleggers paid off the federal chemists and hired their own to neutralize the toxins in the alcohol. Eventually, the lack of obedience to the laws of Prohibition frustrated the government. The government invested more in their scientific processes, creating new blends to increase the toxicity of the chemicals in the industrial alcohol. The federal government's chemists finally found a denaturing formula that the bootleggers couldn't beat. They added a large amount of methyl alcohol. "As one government chemist told reporters, no one had figured out how to completely detoxify wood alcohol. Soon after, the Treasury Department, under the direction of President Calvin Coolidge and Congress, mandated that industrial alcohol contain their newly discovered blend. Illicit beverages became very lethal, even with the efforts of bootlegger chemists to remove threats. A very small amount of undiluted methyl alcohol could kill a human being, and the effects were quickly realized. In 1926 New York City, 585 people died from this government action. Over 5000 fatalities from this poisoning, at least a 600% increase from the previous deaths from alcohol, were said to have resulted in the entire country. Other sources inflate this number further to 10,000 deaths and many more blinded from the effects of methanol poisoning.

Before the government started this process, bootleggers were already making alcoholic beverages unsafe for the public. These illicit liquor manufacturers found that by adding some questionable ingredients, they could simulate certain types of beverages they had enjoyed before prohibition, or create entirely new flavors. Some bootleggers added dead rats to their moonshine to make their alcohol taste like bourbon. Others used tar and oil from trees to replace gin and scotch. Contraband beer or wine was fairly easy to come by, unlike these new drinks. Concocting these flavors increased demand for their products. However, these practices made it very unhealthy to drink illegal alcohol. As such, doctors were quite familiar with frequent visits from those who became sick from drinking. This was a major contributor to the amount of people that had adverse health effects from drinking alcohol during Prohibition.

Conspiracy theories 
Many conspiracies came from the Prohibition era in the United States, though many of the details came from those who were under the influence of alcohol. In 1927, most of the industrial alcohol in the United States had been poisoned under the order of the government. The government had created a blend that contended with the bootleggers’ chemists. This blend included a large amount of methyl (wood) alcohol or methanol. In 1928, an influential jazz soloist by the name of Bix Beiderbecke drank a poisoned cocktail in New York. He fell ill and, with a weakened immune system, succumbed to pneumonia about 2 years later. Extensive medical records of his case are accessible. As Deborah Blum describes, drinking alcohol poisoned with methyl alcohol would cause dizziness and nausea, not unlike a more extreme version of the effects of normal grain-based alcohols. However, "people poisoned [with methyl alcohol] would often seem to recover from that first bout of dizzy sickness, [feeling] better while the alcohol was being metabolized." The poisoned alcohol had the effects of other alcohol, but methyl alcohol is not easy for the human body to break down, so it became more poisonous. Eventually, the seemingly harmless alcohol becomes lethal and acidic substances in the stomach. These by-products of metabolism quickly destroyed the affected's optic nerve and lungs. Bix Beiderbecke was a tough case because of his long history as an alcoholic and cigarette addict, but his symptoms nearly perfectly matched the side effects of methyl alcohol poisoning. The conclusion is that Bix Beiderbecke was one of many victims of the poisoning of alcohol during Prohibition.

Another conspiracy theory of Prohibition is in the more contemporary context of medical drug use controversies. The 18th Amendment and its accompanying enforcement act were quite specific about all aspects of the prohibition of alcohol in the United States. These laws anticipated many of the major issues that would come because of Prohibition, but they underestimated the breadth and scope of the issues. One clause included a statement that read "no one but a physician holding a permit to prescribe liquor shall issue any prescription for liquor." As stated by The Washington Post, licensed physicians could prescribe alcohol in restricted quantities for medical purposes. During this time, the Bureau of Prohibition "issued…[these] permits to 64,000 physicians, but only revoked [around] 170 licenses…per year". However, with the enforcement problems that the government faced, they were unable to keep up with the thousands of prescriptions doctors wrote every day. Doctors were constantly pressured to prescribe liquor, and the limited enforcement meant they didn't have to worry about consequences.

Congress eventually realized it had to do something about the issue and passed the Emergency Beer bill in 1921, even under pressure from the American Medical Association not to. This act of legislation limited the types of liquor and the alcohol content that a physician could prescribe. Permits themselves weren't enough anymore. A limit was placed on the number of patients that doctors could prescribe alcohol to. Eventually, the pharmaceutical associations began to fight these regulations, but it was not long after that the 18th amendment was repealed, ending Prohibition. Still, the effects of this issue live on. According to the U.S. National Library of Medicine, the end of Prohibition brought about the decriminalization of many drugs for medical use. Law enforcement and politics have come to be an integral part of the medical world.

Effects and modern examples 
The effects of Prohibition and the questionable decisions of the United States government to enforce these laws were widespread. Prohibition in the United States wasn't an isolated incident, it was a worldwide movement that included Russia, Canada, and New Zealand among others. Wartime procedures and religious efforts ended one of the most alcohol-filled eras ever. Beer production was at an all-time high, along with other alcoholic beverages. Trade routes and markets were reliant on this big business. Prohibition wiped out an enormous, thriving industry. Thousands lost jobs as businesses like liquor stores, breweries, distilleries, and even theaters or clubs who all relied upon the market of alcohol were forced to shut down. Some believe that the 18th amendment had more of an economic effect than it ever did on the citizens who were supposed to comply. The American Journal of Public Health published an article that shows why the bootlegging industry of denatured industrial alcohol was created to combat Prohibition. In many ways, bootlegging kept the market for alcoholic drinks alive, but now the money was going to a completely different set of people. Bootlegged alcohol also attracted more people to the drinking lifestyle because it was more exciting to do it undercover.

One of the key statistics that shows how much alcohol the U.S. government poisoned to enforce Prohibition with this opposition is the number of people who were hospitalized or died from drinking the toxic alcohol. There is little reliable information about this issue. Some believe that the government poisoned over 10,000 Americans, whereas others believe it was mainly limited to New York City. Either way, poisoning was not an effective enforcement strategy. People were addicted, uninformed, and enjoyed living above the law. The temperance movement, which instigated Prohibition, led many to believe that alcohol was immoral and destructive to society. Those who were part of the movement hoped that a ban would help people to change their attitudes toward the substance. Evidently, the "noble experiment" of Prohibition in the United States did not have that effect. The current war on drugs in the United States has been heavily influenced by the events that occurred and the public and business opinions that were expressed during Prohibition. 

Though the temperance and prohibition movement are largely associated with the United States, several other countries adopted similar methods of controlling alcohol during that time. Some of the other countries that limited alcohol during the prohibition era were "Iceland, Finland, both czarist Russia and the Soviet Union, Canadian provinces, and Canada's federal government." Similarly, modern examples of prohibition and alcohol poisoning can be found today in other countries.

Covid-19 had drastic effects on the world and in a particular case it also helped spur a methanol poisoning outbreak in Iran. At the start of Covid-19, little was done to prepare for and prevent rapid spread throughout the country. Additionally, false information was provided on how to treat the virus, one of the methods being gargling and consuming alcohol. Because production of alcohol is illegal in Iran, bootlegging and illegal production of the substance began to increase. Home-brewed alcohol often contained methanol and other toxic chemicals that were extremely harmful to the body. By May 2020, several thousand were admitted to the hospital due to alcohol poisoning, and an estimated 500 individuals died while under care. Improper medical practices, lack of equipment, and limited capacity due to Covid-19 patients all contributed to the issue.

Another modern example of the issue of prohibition and methanol poisoning happened in the Czech Republic in 2012. This prohibition act was to reduce alcohol poisoning. Methanol (methyl or wood alcohol) poisonings were common as illegal alcohol flooded the market. The Czech Republic government wanted to stop the poisonings, so they prohibited the sale of alcoholic drinks that had more than a 20% alcohol content. However, the prohibitionary effort had little effect. Instead, the ban was lifted after only a few weeks when the Czech Ministry of Health saw that it was not slowing methanol poisonings. The U.S. National Library of Medicine published an article that performed a small study of Czech citizens. Consisting of some interviews and polls, the study determined that over one third of alcohol users drank liquors with that much alcohol content during the short prohibition. Several participants drank more alcohol with less alcohol content, but the prohibition did not result in healthier drinking habits.

References 

Wikipedia Student Program
Prohibition in the United States